Raikes may refer to:

Members of the prominent English family:

 Robert Raikes the Elder (1690-1757),  British printer and newspaper proprietor
 Robert Raikes (1736-1811), English promoter of Sunday Schools and philanthropist, eldest son of the above
 Robert Napier Raikes (1813-1909), British soldier in India, grandson of the above
 Cyril Raikes (1875-1963), British soldier, son of the above
 Job Mathew Raikes (1767–1833) Governor of the Bank of England from 1801 to 1802
 Thomas Raikes ("the Elder") (1741-1813), British banker, Governor of the Bank of England, third son of Robert Raikes the Elder
 Thomas Raikes (dandy) ("the Younger") (1777-1848), British merchant banker, dandy and diarist, eldest son of the above
 Harriet Raikes, novelist, daughter of the above
 Henry Raikes (1782-1854), British clergyman, younger son of Thomas Raikes "the Elder" 
 Henry Cecil Raikes (1838-1891), British Conservative politician, son of the above
 Sir Victor Raikes (1901-1986), British Conservative politician, grandson of the above
 Dick Raikes (1912 – 2005) Royal Naval Commander
Arthur Raikes (1867-1915), British army officer
Ernest Raikes, English cricketer
George Raikes (1873-1966), English cricketer and footballer, brother of Ernest Raikes
 Sir Iwan Raikes (1921 – 2011) Vice-Admiral, Royal Navy officer who became Naval Secretary, son of Admiral Sir Robert Raikes.
Raymond Raikes (1910-1998), English radio classics director and producer
 Sir Robert Raikes (Royal Navy officer)  (1885–1953) Royal Navy officer
Robert Raikes (1765-1837), English banker
Robert Raikes (1683-1753), British Member of Parliament for Northallerton
Thomas Raikes (cricketer) (1902-1984), English cricketer

United States

Jeff Raikes (b. 1958), former chief executive officer of the Bill & Melinda Gates Foundation and co-founder of the Raikes Foundation
Tricia Raikes, co-founder of the Raikes Foundation of America
Ron Raikes (1948-2009), farmer and Nebraska state senator